Federico Marigosu (born 21 April 2001) is an Italian footballer who plays as a midfielder for Trapani.

Club career
He was raised in Cagliari junior teams and made his Serie A debut for the club on 26 July 2020 in a game against Udinese.

On 11 September 2020 he joined Olbia on loan.

On 13 July 2021 he moved on loan to Grosseto.

On 27 July 2022, Marigosu signed with Trapani in Serie D.

Club statistics

Club

References

2001 births
Living people
Sportspeople from Cagliari
Footballers from Sardinia
Italian footballers
Association football midfielders
Serie A players
Serie C players
Cagliari Calcio players
Olbia Calcio 1905 players
U.S. Grosseto 1912 players
Trapani Calcio players
Italy youth international footballers